Francisco Castillo may refer to:

Francisco Castillo Fajardo, Marquis of Villadarias (1642–1716), Spanish general
Francisco Castillo Nájera (1886–1954), Mexican diplomat
Francisco Castillo (footballer) (born 1985), Chilean footballer
Francisco Castillo (water polo) (1921–1997), Spanish water polo player